Chak Sher Muhammad railway station is a station in Chak Sher Muhammad village, Mandi Bahauddin district, Punjab, Pakistan.

References

Railway stations on Shorkot–Lalamusa Branch Line
Railway stations in Mandi Bahauddin District